The 20th Annual D.I.C.E. Awards is the 20th edition of the D.I.C.E. Awards, an annual awards event that honors the best games in the video game industry. It was also held as part of the Academy's 2017 D.I.C.E. Summit, and was co-hosted by Jessica Chobot of Nerdist News, and Kinda Funny co-founder Greg Miller.

Overwatch won Game of the Year and tied for winning the most awards with Uncharted 4: A Thief's End which received the most nominations. Sony Interactive Entertainment published the most nominated titles and the most winners, with Naughty Dog being the most nominated and award winning developer.

Todd Howard, lead director and executive producer for The Elder Scrolls and Fallout franchises at Bethesda Game Studios, received the Hall of Fame Award.

Winners and Nominees
Winners are listed first, highlighted in boldface, and indicated with a double dagger.

Special Awards

Hall of Fame
 Todd Howard

Games with multiple nominations and awards

The following 20 games received multiple nominations:

The following five games received multiple awards:

Companies with multiple nominations

Companies that received multiple nominations as either a developer or a publisher.

Companies that received multiple awards as either a developer or a publisher.

External links

References

2017 awards
2017 awards in the United States
February 2017 events in the United States
2016 in video gaming
D.I.C.E. Award ceremonies